Deltophora caymana is a moth of the family Gelechiidae. It is found on the Cayman Islands.

The length of the forewings is 3.5–4 mm. Adults have been recorded on wing in May and July.

References

Moths described in 1979
Deltophora
Taxa named by Klaus Sattler